Tammileru is a medium river which forms the boundary between Krishna district and Eluru district of Andhra Pradesh state. It is an area that is often affected by floods. The river drains into the Kolleru lake.

Tammileru dam was constructed in the year 1980 to irrigate 3,720 hectares of land.

References

Rivers of Andhra Pradesh
Geography of Krishna district
Geography of West Godavari district
Rivers of India